The Boomerang Nebula is a protoplanetary nebula located 5,000 light-years away from Earth in the constellation Centaurus. It is also known as the Bow Tie Nebula and catalogued as LEDA 3074547. The nebula's temperature is measured at  making it the coolest natural place currently known in the Universe.

The Boomerang Nebula is believed to be a star system evolving toward the planetary nebula phase. It continues to form and develop due to the outflow of gas from its core where a star in its late stage life sheds mass and emits starlight illuminating dust in the nebula. Millimeter scale dust grains mask portions of the nebula's center so most escaping visible light is in two opposing lobes forming a distinctive hourglass shape as viewed from Earth. The outflowing gas is moving outwards at a speed of about 164 km/s and expanding rapidly as it moves out into space; this gas expansion results in the nebula's unusually low temperature.

Keith Taylor and Mike Scarrott called it the "Boomerang Nebula" in 1980 after observing it with the Anglo-Australian telescope at the Siding Spring Observatory. Unable to view it with great clarity, the astronomers saw merely a slight asymmetry in the nebula's lobes suggesting a curved shape like a boomerang. The nebula was photographed in detail by the Hubble Space Telescope in 1998 revealing a more symmetric hourglass shape.

In 1995, using the 15-metre Swedish-ESO Submillimetre Telescope in Chile, astronomers measured its temperature as one degree above absolute zero (−272.15 °C). This makes it the coldest place in the Universe found so far, besides laboratory-created temperatures. Even the 2.7 K background glow from the Big Bang is warmer than the nebula. It is the only naturally occurring object found so far that has a temperature lower than the background radiation.

In 2013, observations of the ALMA radio interferometer revealed other features of the Boomerang Nebula. The visible double lobe of the Boomerang Nebula was observed to be surrounded by a larger spherical volume of cold gas seen only in sub-millimeter radio wavelengths. The nebula's outer fringes appear to be gradually warming.

As of mid-2017, it is believed that the star at the center of the nebula is a dying red giant.

Gallery

References

External links 
NRAO Boomerang Nebula 

 The Boomerang Nebula - The Coolest Place in the Universe?, ESA, 20 February 2003
 Hubble's View of the Boomerang Nebula, 13 September 2005; see also Scattered Light from the Boomerang Nebula
ESA/Hubble-Boomerang Nebula
SIMBAD, Coordinates and Scientific data. January 4, 2007.

Protoplanetary nebulae
Centaurus (constellation)
Stellar evolution
Nebulae